Hun Sen Cup, the main football knockout tournament in Cambodia.The 2014 Hun Sen Cup is the 8th season of the Hun Sen Cup, the premier knockout tournament for association football clubs in Cambodia involving Cambodian League and provincial teams organized by the Football Federation of Cambodia.

Nagaworld FC were the defending champions, having beaten National Defense Ministry FC 5–3 on penalty shoot-out after 0-0 extra time in the previous season's final.

Qualifying round
The matches were arranged in six regions and divided into six groups. The top three teams in Group A and the top one team of other five groups from B to F advanced to the Group stage with the eight teams (rank 1 to 8) of Cambodian League 2013.

Group A - Asia Euro United, Western Phnom Penh, Khan Chamkarmon, Khan Meanchey, Khan Dongkor

Group B - Tri Asia, Prey Veng, Svay Rieng Military Police

Group C - Oddar Meanchey, Preah Vihear, Baksei Chamkrong (Siem Reap), Kompong Thom

Group D - Kampong Chhnang, Rice Bank (Pursat), Battambang, Pailin Police

Group E - Sihanouk, Kep, Kampot, Koh Kong Military Police

Group F - Kratie (only one team in this group)

Group stage
The teams finishing in the top two positions in each of the four groups (highlighted in tables) in group stage progressed to the quarter-finals.

Group A

Group B

Group C

Group D

Quarter-finals

Semi-finals

Third place play-off

Final

Awards
 Top goal scorer (The golden boot): Khoun Laboravy of Boeung Ket Angkor (12 goals)
 Goalkeeper of the season (The golden glove): Prak Monyphearun of Police FC
 The player of the season: Tith Dina of Police FC
 Fair Play: Boeung Ket Angkor

See also
 2014 Cambodian League
 Cambodian League
 Hun Sen Cup

References

Hun Sen Cup seasons
Hun Sen Cup
Hun Sen Cup